Bourgeois is a French surname.

Geographical distribution
As of 2014, 49.6% of all known bearers of the surname Bourgeois were residents of France (frequency 1:1,819), 24.8% of the United States (1:19,760), 15.8% of Canada (1:3,157), 5.4% of Belgium (1:2,892) and 1.5% of Switzerland (1:7,254).

In France, the frequency of the surname was higher than national average (1:1,819) in the following regions:
 1. Bourgogne-Franche-Comté (1:548)
 2. Guadeloupe (1:758)
 3. Saint Pierre and Miquelon (1:914)
 4. Centre-Val de Loire (1:1,127)
 5. Hauts-de-France (1:1,238)
 6. Grand Est (1:1,575)
 7. Île-de-France (1:1,718)
 8. Normandy (1:1,802)

People
 Albéric Bourgeois (1876–1962), Canadian comic strip artist
 Amandine Bourgeois (born 1979), French singer
 Bradley Bourgeois (born 1994), American soccer player
 Brent Bourgeois (born 1958), American rock musician and producer
 Célia Bourgeois (born 1983), French cross-country skier
 Charles Bourgeois (1879–1940), Canadian politician
 Constant Bourgeois (1767–1841), French landscape painter and engraver
 Dana Bourgeois (born 1953), American luthier
 Derek Bourgeois (1941–2017), English composer
 Diane Bourgeois (born 1949), Canadian politician
 Douglas Bourgeois (born 1951), American sculptor and painter
 Émile Bourgeois (1857–1934), French historian
 Francis Bourgeois (1756–1811), British landscape painter and court painter to George III
 Geert Bourgeois (born 1951), Flemish politician
 Gérard Bourgeois (1874–1944), French film director
 Jason Bourgeois (born 1982), American baseball player
 Jules Bourgeois (1847–1911), French entomologist
 Mistinguett (born Jeanne Bourgeois, 1873–1956), French actress and singer
 Joël Bourgeois (born 1971), Canadian distance runner
 Léon Bourgeois (1851–1925), French statesman
 Louis Bourgeois (architect) (1856–1930), Canadian architect
 Louis Bourgeois (composer) (c.1510–1560), aka Loys Bourgeois, French composer
 Louise Bourgeois (1911–2010), French-American artist and sculptor
 Marie Bourgeois (1870–1937), French chef
 Paulette Bourgeois (born 1951), Canadian children's writer
 Roy Bourgeois (born 1938), American human rights activist
 Victor Bourgeois (1897–1962), Belgian Modernist architect
 Yvonne Bourgeois (1902–1983), French tennis player

See also
 Élie Bourgois (1881–1946), French gymnast
 Philippe Bourgois, professor of anthropology and the author of ethnographic works
 Siméon Bourgois (1815–1887), 19th-century French Navy officer

References

French-language surnames
Surnames of French origin